Andrew Colin Cottam (born 14 July 1973 in Northampton, England) was an English cricketer. He was a right-handed batsman and a left-arm slow bowler. He played in 2 Under-19 Tests in 1992 and 13 first-class matches between 1992 and 1996. His father is the cricketer and coach Bob Cottam.

In 1990 Andy Cottam started playing for Somerset Second XI and Devon. In 1992 he was selected for Under-19's tour of Pakistan and played in the Third Test and 2 one-day matches against Pakistan Under-19s. That summer he played in 6 County Championship matches for Somerset and in an Under-19 Test against Sri Lanka, when he took 4 wickets for 69 in the first innings. However, in 1993 he failed to make the Somerset First XI, apart from a one-day match against Kent.

In 1994 he moved to Northants but did not play for the first team and he signed for Derbyshire in 1995. He played in 4 County Championship matches and in a university game and was released at the end of the season. He returned to Somerset, where his father was director of cricket, and played in 2 County Championship matches in 1996. He played for Somerset Second XI in 1997 and for Devon until 1999.

Although an economy as a bowler of under three per over in first-class cricket was acceptable, Cottam's bowling did not look like it would do more than take the occasional wicket and he was always a tail-end batsman, so his first-class career was inevitably a short one.

References

External links
Andy Cottam at Cricket Archive

1973 births
English cricketers
Living people
Cricketers from Northampton
Somerset cricketers
Derbyshire cricketers
Devon cricketers